Parallel Trips is a 2004 Cypriot documentary film, written, produced and directed by Derviş Zaim and Panicos Chrysanthou, in which the two directors, from opposite sides of the divided island of Cyprus, record the human dramas that unfolded during the war of 1974 and the legacy that remains today. The film was screened at the Istanbul International Film Festival and the 12th London Turkish Film Festival.

Festival Screenings 
 Bodrum International Documentary Film Festival (2004)
 Istanbul International Film Festival (2004)
 12th London Turkish Film Festival (2004)

Reviews 
Time Out London says that this, ambitious documentary, is a lengthy, slow-paced series of anecdotes narrated by those who experienced the horror of the troubles in Cyprus, both Turkish and Greek, which is, at times difficult to watch and poorly subtitled,  This is a film, by the end of which peace, community and the experience of war take on much deeper meanings, where, the good nature of the people recounting their stories makes the actions of the past all the more incomprehensible.

See also
 2004 in film

References

2004 documentary films
Turkish documentary films
Greek-language films
2000s Turkish-language films
Films set in Turkey
Films set in Cyprus
Films shot in Turkey
Films shot in Cyprus
Films directed by Derviş Zaim
Documentary films about war
2004 films